Prairie Museum may refer to:

in Canada
Grande Prairie Museum, Grande Prairie, Alberta, museum in Grande Prairie
Living Prairie Museum, Winnipeg, Manitoba, includes  preserved tall grass prairie
Prairie River Museum, Prairie River, Porcupine No. 395, Saskatchewan

in the United States
Museum of the Grand Prairie in the village of Mahomet, Illinois
Conner Prairie: Indiana's Living History Museum, Hamilton County, Indiana
Sheldon Prairie Museum, Sheldon, Iowa
Prairie Museum of Art and History, Colby, Kansas
Stuhr Museum of the Prairie Pioneer, in Grand Island, Nebraska
Hastings Prairie Museum, Hastings, Nebraska
Nebraska Prairie Museum,  Holdrege, Nebraska
Dacotah Prairie Museum, Aberdeen, South Dakota

See also
Little House on the Prairie Museum, Independence, Kansas
Breaking the Prairie Museum, Mendota, Illinois
Prairie Elevator Museum, Acadia Valley, Alberta